Bajiaotai railway station is a third-class railway station in Xinlong Subdistrict, Linghai, Jinzhou, Liaoning on the Jinzhou–Chengde railway. It was built in 1921. It is under the jurisdiction of China Railway Shenyang Group.

References 

Railway stations in Liaoning
Stations on the Jinzhou–Chengde railway